Martin Vilhelm Ljung (15 August 1917, in Notviken, Luleå – 30 September 2010, in Stockholm) was a Swedish comedian, actor and singer.

An apprentice blacksmith turned entertainer, his movie debut was in 1947, when he had uncredited appearances in several films, including the comedy Stackars lilla Sven with Nils Poppe and the drama Rallare (Navvies), directed by Arne Mattsson.

Ljung worked together with Povel Ramel for many years, and acted and sang in several of Ramel's revues, where he also performed comic monologues, including Ester and Fingal Olsson, which have become Swedish comedy classics.

He also worked with Hasse Alfredson and Tage Danielsson, in revues such as Spader, Madame! and Glaset i Örat, and movies such as The Apple War.

Selected filmography
 Rail Workers (1947)
 The Realm of the Rye (1950)
 Kalle Karlsson of Jularbo (1952)
 Dance in the Smoke (1954)
 The Staffan Stolle Story (1956)
 The Great Amateur (1958)

References

Ericson, Uno Myggan, Myggans Nöjeslexikon (Myggan's Encyclopedia of Entertainment), vol. 10 (1992)

External links

1917 births
2010 deaths
People from Luleå Municipality
Swedish male actors
Swedish comedy musicians